The Hollenbach Building was a building at 808 W. Lake Street in Chicago's Fulton Market District, which was designed by Worthmann & Steinbach and was built in 1912. It was built at a cost of $12,000, and was owned by Charles Hollenbach, housing the Hollenbach Seed Company. An addition was proposed in 1919, to be designed by Worthmann & Steinbach, but no permit was ever issued for its construction. Hollenbach Seed Company left the building in 1958, moving to the northwest suburbs.

Kathy Kozan purchased the building for $190,000 in 1994, after initially leasing it. She was its third owner and renovated the building. It served as home to Kozan Design Studios, a creator of custom art for trade shows, theaters, theme parks, and other clients until 2010. It also contained an apartment where Kozan resided. The building was filled with unique colorful sculptures during this period.

In 2013, the building was sold to One Off Hospitality Group for $1.7 million. The first floor would house One Off Hospitality Group's Publican Quality Bread. In 2019, developer North Park Ventures announced its plans to demolish the Hollenbach Building and adjacent buildings and build a 19-story hotel and office building. A demolition permit was issued on December 9, 2020, and the building was demolished in January 2021.

References

1912 establishments in Illinois
Buildings and structures completed in 1912
Buildings and structures demolished in 2021
2021 disestablishments in Illinois
Demolished buildings and structures in Chicago